Philip Nott Ober (March 23, 1902 – September 13, 1982) was an American screen and stage actor. He later retired from acting to work as a diplomat.

Ober is best remembered for his roles in the films From Here to Eternity (1953) and North by Northwest (1959). His other notable credits include The Magnificent Yankee (1950), Broken Lance (1954), Torpedo Run (1958) and The Ugly American (1963).

Early years
The son of Frank Ober, he was raised in White Plains, New York. After attending The Peddie School and Princeton University, he worked in advertising before moving into acting. In a 1935 interview, he claimed "I got kicked out of Princeton in sophomore year."

Acting career
Ober often appeared in roles as a straight man in farcical circumstances. He made his debut on stage, playing Tom Faulkner in Technique in 1931. He appeared  in Lawrence Riley's Broadway show Personal Appearance (1934) opposite Gladys George.

Ober's film debut came in Chloe, Love Is Calling You (1934).

From 1954 to 1967, he frequently appeared in television series. He appeared in the episode "The Vultures" of Sugarfoot. 

Ober was twice cast on I Love Lucy, first playing "Arnold" in episode 5, "The Quiz Show," and later portraying the Hollywood producer Dore Schary in episode 119, "Don Juan is Shelved" when Schary decided at the last minute not to play himself. He made five appearances on Perry Mason, including that of defendant Peter Dawson in the 1960 episode, "The Case of the Treacherous Toupee", and the dual role of murder victim Sumner Hodge and his brother Adrian Hodge in the 1964 episode, "The Case of the Tandem Target". He also appeared in one episode of The Twilight Zone ("Spur of the Moment"), co-starring Diana Hyland, and in one episode ("Bankrupt Alibi") of Whirlybirds in which he portrayed a man who convinces his son to take the blame for a hit-and-run accident he committed.  He made one guest appearance on the 1961 crime adventure-drama series The Investigators and four on the comedy series Hazel. Also in 1961, he appeared as "General Silas Guild" in the TV Western series Bat Masterson (S3E18 "The Prescott Campaign"). He had a recurring role as General Wingard Stone in the early episodes of I Dream of Jeannie, appeared in two episodes of McHale's Navy as tough-as-nails Admiral "Iron Pants" Rafferty, and played the museum curator Dr. Wilkerson in episode 32 of The Munsters, "Mummy Munster," in 1965.

Ober continued to work as an actor in films. He played the United Nations ambassador in Alfred Hitchcock's North by Northwest (1959) whom Roger Thornhill (Cary Grant) meets, to clarify who had occupied his mansion. He also played Capt. Dana "Dynamite" Holmes, the neglectful, unsympathetic husband of Karen Holmes  (Deborah Kerr), in the film version of From Here to Eternity (1953).

Post-acting career
He retired from acting and went into the U.S. diplomatic service, serving as consular agent to the U.S. consul in Puerto Vallarta, Mexico.

Personal life
Ober's uncle was American naturalist and writer Frederick A. Ober. 

Ober was married to the former Phyllis Roper. 

On August 12, 1941, Ober married actress Vivian Vance. They divorced in 1959.

Ober's third marriage was to Jane Westover; they were married from 1961 until Ober's death in 1982.

Death
Although many sources report that Ober died of a heart attack in Mexico City at the age of 80, Associated Press obituaries quote a hospital spokesperson that Ober died of lung cancer at Santa Monica Hospital in Santa Monica, California, on September 13, 1982.  The California Death Index and Social Security Death Index substantiate this information.

Filmography 

1934: Chloe, Love Is Calling You – Jim Strong
1938: Little Me
1950: The Secret Fury – Gregory Kent
1950: Never a Dull Moment – Jed
1950: The Magnificent Yankee – Owen Wister / Narrator
1951: The Unknown Man – Wayne Kellwin
1952: Washington Story – Gilbert Nunnally
1952: Come Back, Little Sheba – Ed Anderson
1953: The Clown – Ralph Z. Henderson
1953: The Girls of Pleasure Island – Col. Reade
1953: Scandal at Scourie – B. G. Belney
1953: From Here to Eternity – Capt. Dana 'Dynamite' Holmes
1954: About Mrs. Leslie – Mort Finley
1954: Broken Lance – Van Cleve
1956: Calling Terry Conway (TV Movie) – Stan
1957: Tammy and the Bachelor – Alfred Bissle
1957: Escapade in Japan – Lt. Col. Hargrave
1958: The High Cost of Loving – Herb Zorn
1958: Ten North Frederick – Lloyd Williams
1958: Torpedo Run – Adm. Samuel Setton
1959: The Mating Game – Wendell Burnshaw
1959: North by Northwest – Lester Townsend
1959: Beloved Infidel – John Wheeler
1960: Elmer Gantry – Rev. Planck
1960: Let No Man Write My Epitaph – Grant Holloway
1960: The Facts of Life – Doc Mason
1961: Go Naked in the World – Josh Kebner
1961: The Crimebusters – Herman Hauzner
1963: The Ugly American – Ambassador Sears
1964: The Brass Bottle – William Beevor
1966: The Ghost and Mr. Chicken – Nicholas Simmons
1968: Assignment to Kill – Bohlen (final film role)

References

External links
 
 
 

1902 births
1982 deaths
American male film actors
American male stage actors
American male television actors
People from Fort Payne, Alabama
Male actors from Alabama
20th-century American male actors
American expatriates in Mexico